Yi Xudi (born 20 August 1993) is a Chinese rower. He competed in the 2020 Summer Olympics.

References

1993 births
Living people
Rowers at the 2020 Summer Olympics
Chinese male rowers
Olympic rowers of China